David Johansen is a 1978 album by the rock musician David Johansen and his first solo album following his tenure as lead singer of the New York Dolls.  The album was released on Blue Sky Records, a sub-label of Columbia Records that was associated with Johnny and Edgar Winter.  David Johansen also features fellow New York Doll guitarist Sylvain Sylvain, who was a member of the David Johansen Band at that time.  Sylvain co-wrote four of the songs with Johansen.  The single from the album was Johansen and Sylvain's "Funky But Chic", backed with "The Rope (The Let Go Song)", which has been included as a bonus track on the CD. David Johansen was voted the tenth best record of 1978 in the Pazz & Jop, an annual poll of American critics published by The Village Voice.

Track listing
All songs by David Johansen and Sylvain Sylvain except as indicated.

Side one
"Funky But Chic" 
"Girls" 
"Pain in My Heart" (Johansen)
"Not That Much" (Johansen, Buz Verno)
"Donna" (Johansen)

Side two
"Cool Metro" 
"I'm a Lover" (Johansen, Johnny Ráo, Thomas Trask, Buz Verno)
"Lonely Tenement" (Johansen)
"Frenchette"

Bonus track
"The Rope (The Let Go Song)" (Johansen)

Personnel

David Johansen – vocals, guitar on "Donna", castanets & chimes on "Frenchette"
Frankie LaRocka – drums, vocals on "Funky But Chic", "Girls", "Pain in My Heart" and "I'm a Lover"
Johnny Ráo – guitar
Thomas Trask – guitar
Buz Verno – bass, vocals on "Funky But Chic", "Pain in My Heart", "Not That Much", "I'm a Lover" and "Lonely Tenement"

Additional personnel
Bobby Blain – organ on "Funky But Chic" and "Cool Metro", piano on "Girls", "Donna" and "Frenchette" (second keyboardist for New York Dolls: 1976-77 and formerly of the band Street Punk)
Stan Bronstein – horn on "Funky But Chic" and "Pain in My Heart"
Felix Cavaliere – organ on "Pain in My Heart"
Sarah Dash – vocals on "Funky But Chic"
Nona Hendryx – vocals on "Funky But Chic"
Joe Perry – rhythm guitar on "Not That Much", guitar on "Cool Metro"
Scarlet Rivera – violin on "Donna" and "Lonely Tenement"
Sylvain Sylvain – guitar on "Cool Metro"
Tony Machine – percussion on "Funky But Chic" (third drummer for New York Dolls: 1976-77)
Gene Leppik – additional vocals
Jimmie Mack – additional vocals

Production
Richard Robinson – producer
David Johansen – producer
David Thoener – engineer
Steve Paul – direction
Jay Krugman – assistant engineer
Gregg Caruso – assistant engineer
Gray Russell – assistant engineer
Greg Calbi  – mastering
Elena Pavlov – cover design
Benno Friedman – cover photography
Gary Green – back cover photography

Charts

Releases
 Cassette	David Johansen Razor & Tie	 1992
 CD	David Johansen Razor & Tie	 1992
 Cassette	David Johansen [Bonus Track] Caroline Distribution	 1992
 CD	David Johansen American Beat Records	 2008
 CD	David Johansen Culture Factory	 2012
 CD	David Johansen Razor & Tie

References

David Johansen albums
1978 debut albums
Blue Sky Records albums
Razor & Tie albums
Columbia Records albums